Staphylea trifolia, the American bladdernut, is native to eastern North America, from southern Ontario and southwestern Quebec west to Nebraska and Arkansas, and south to Florida. It is sometimes used as an ornamental plant. 

Its growth rate is medium to fast. The leaves are bright green in the spring, turning dark green in the summer. S. trifolia produces pendant white flowers in spring, which mature into bladder-like, teardrop-shaped fruits that contain 1-3 brown popcorn-like seeds. Some sources consider these "nuts" to be edible.

References

Staphyleaceae
Plants described in 1753
Taxa named by Carl Linnaeus
Flora of Eastern Canada
Flora of the Northeastern United States
Flora of the Southeastern United States
Flora of the North-Central United States